He Binglin (1916–2007) was a Chinese chemist born in Panyu County, Guangdong Province in China. He studied chemistry in the Southwestern Associated University (Nankai University) in Kunming, and graduated in 1942 before he went to Indiana University, where he obtained his Ph.D. in chemistry in 1952. He returned to China and became a professor in Nankai University in Tianjin, where he set up the Polymer Chemistry Division in 1958. A variety of polymeric ion exchange resins, including strongly and weakly cationic and anionic exchangers, were developed in the research laboratories at Nankai and he also set up a factory administered by the university to produce a series of ion-exchangers for various applications. He is regarded as the founder of China's industry for ion exchange resins.  In 1983, he became the founding director of the Institute of Polymer Chemistry at Nankai University. He authored several books on polymer chemistry and polymer materials and co-authored over 580 scientific articles.  He was also elected to be a member of the Chinese Academy of Sciences of China in 1980. He received more than 30 awards for his research work.

A statue was erected in 2008 in Nankai University to commemorate his life-time achievements and contribution as an educator and as a prominent chemist.

References

1916 births
2007 deaths
Chemists from Guangdong
Educators from Guangdong
Members of the Chinese Academy of Sciences
Academic staff of Nankai University
National Southwestern Associated University alumni
Academic staff of Shandong University
Chinese expatriates in the United States
Indiana University alumni